Price targeting may refer to:

Price discrimination, in which a good or service is sold at different prices to different consumers
Price point, a model of pricing
A mechanism in monetary policy; see Monetary policy#Types